Ghazab Tamasha, is a 1992 family-drama-romantic film, produced and directed by Ranjeet. It featured Rahul Roy and Anu Aggarwal as the lead actors. The movie was the 2nd movie directed by Ranjeet after Kaarnama.

Plot
Struggling through predator eyes, a poor destitute girl Ganga (Anu) meets Sitaram (Rahul). They work as servants in two different families, and help the two families fall in love, as do they themselves.

Cast
 Anu Aggarwal as Ganga
 Rahul Roy as Sitaram

Soundtrack

References

External links 

1992 films
1990s Hindi-language films
1992 romantic drama films
Films scored by Anand–Milind
Indian romantic drama films